Ignacio Poletti (born 28 April 1930) is an Argentine former basketball player who competed in the 1952 Summer Olympics. He was born in Santa Fe.

References

1930 births
Living people
Argentine men's basketball players
Olympic basketball players of Argentina
Basketball players at the 1951 Pan American Games
Basketball players at the 1952 Summer Olympics
Pan American Games silver medalists for Argentina
Pan American Games medalists in basketball
Medalists at the 1951 Pan American Games